Sheahon Jay Zenger (born April 13, 1966) is an American university sports administrator and former assistant American football coach. Zenger currently serves as the athletic director at the University of New Haven. He previously was fired from his role as the athletic director at the University of Kansas in 2018 where he had served since 2011, and Illinois State University.

Career

Early career 
Zenger played football for MidAmerica Nazarene University for two years before finishing his football career at Fort Hays State University. After the football season was over in 1986, Zenger transferred to Kansas State University where he graduated in 1987. Zenger then began his career in athletics as a recruiting coordinator for the Kansas State football team in 1988 while completing his master's degree. He completed his doctorate from the University of Kansas in 1996. Zenger later served as the recruiting coordinator at University of South Florida in 1996 and then moved to Wyoming for the same position, holding that position until 2001. In 2001, Zenger moved back to Kansas to become the assistant athletic director for development at Kansas State University, a position he would hold from 2001 to 2004.

Illinois State 
In April 2005, Zenger was named the next athletic director at Illinois State University. While at Illinois State, Zenger focused on athletes' academics increasing their grade point averages, resulting in more scholarship opportunities through donors. Zenger also contracted with Nike and multi-million dollar renovations to athletic facilities.

University of Kansas 
In January 2011, Zenger was named the next athletics director for the University of Kansas. One month later on February 1, 2011, Zenger officially took over the Kansas Athletics Department after the school was battling a ticket scandal from former employees. During his time at Kansas, Zenger has hired two football coaches, Charlie Weis and David Beaty in hopes to produce a winning program. Since September 2017, Zenger has spearheaded a $350 million campaign to renovate Memorial Stadium and rename it to the "David Booth Kansas Memorial Stadium", after alumni David Booth pledged $50 million to the Athletics Department. During his tenure at Kansas the athletics department built nine new facilities. Zenger was fired on May 21, 2018 due to a "lack of progress" within the department.

Lawrence Free State High School 
A few weeks following his departure from the University of Kansas, Zenger joined the coaching staff at Lawrence Free State High School in Lawrence, Kansas, the same city that the University of Kansas calls home. Zenger was hired by LFSHS as their Linebackers coach. The Lawrence Free State Firebirds went 10–1 over the course of the 2018 football season, and ended the season as the 12th ranked team in the state of Kansas.

University of New Haven 
Zenger was introduced as the Director of Athletics and Recreation at the University of New Haven on September 5, 2019, succeeding former NFL head coach Chris Palmer, who retired from the school's athletic director position in June 2019. Zenger was hired to direct the University's exploration of a potential move from NCAA Division II to Division I, oversee construction of new athletic facilities, as well as guide the New Haven Department of Athletics' multi-million capital fundraising campaign for athletics.

In addition to his athletic director duties, Zenger also co-teaches a literature class alongside university president, Stephen Kaplan.

References

External links 
 New Haven bio

1966 births
Fort Hays State Tigers football players
Illinois State Redbirds athletic directors
Kansas Jayhawks athletic directors
Kansas Jayhawks football coaches
Kansas State University alumni
Living people
MidAmerica Nazarene Pioneers football players
Sportspeople from Salina, Kansas
South Florida Bulls football coaches
University of Kansas alumni
Wyoming Cowboys football coaches